Mi amor frente al pasado may refer to:
 Mi amor frente al pasado (1960 TV series), a Mexican telenovela
 Mi amor frente al pasado (1979 TV series), a Mexican telenovela